Nikolai Sergeyevich Valuev (born 21 August 1973) is a Russian politician and former professional boxer. He competed in boxing from 1993 to 2009, and held the WBA heavyweight title twice between 2005 and 2009.

Biography
Valuev was born on 21 August 1973, in Leningrad, Russian SFSR, Soviet Union (now Saint Petersburg, Russia). He is of ethnic Russian descent, but he also had a Tatar grandfather. Although his own parents are short—both 1.67m (5'6") tall—his Tatar great-grandfather has been described as "of mountainous proportions" and "a warrior giant of Russian folklore."  His own size and appearance are due to gigantism complicated by acromegaly.

Valuev is a Russian Orthodox Christian. 

Valuev has written a book in Russian called My 12 Rounds, with the help of Russian sports journalist Konstantin Osipov. The book discusses his life in general and his boxing career in particular. For that book, Valuev received an award from the government of Saint Petersburg. 

In January 2006, Valuev was accused of assaulting a security guard at the Spartak Ice Palace in Saint Petersburg. No criminal investigation was launched by local police.

Amateur career

Highlights
Russian National Championships (+91 kg), Saint Petersburg, Russia, May 1994:
1/4: Lost to Alexei Lezin
Goodwill Games (+91 kg), Saint Petersburg, July 1994:
1/4: Lost to Alexei Lezin (Russia) on points, 8–+8ut.

Professional career

First reign as WBA heavyweight champion
In 2005, Valuev squared off with WBA heavyweight champion John Ruiz, and won a twelve-round majority-decision, becoming both the tallest (7 ft or 2.13 m) and heaviest (323 lbs or 147 kg) champion in boxing history.

Valuev vs. Chagaev

The title defense was held on 14 April 2007. Chagaev defeated Valuev by a majority decision (117–111, 115–113 and 114–114).

Valuev changed trainers, from Manuel Gabrielian to Alexander Zimin, who coached the old Soviet Union amateur boxing team. On 29 September 2007, Valuev won against Jean-Francois Bergeron in Oldenburg, Germany, by a 12-round unanimous decision (118–111 on all three cards).

Second reign as WBA champion

Valuev vs. Liakhovich
On 16 February 2008, in a title eliminator, Valuev defeated former titleholder Siarhei Liakhovich, winning every round at the Nuremberg Arena in Germany. The victory earned Valuev the right to face Chagaev for the WBA title again, the only man who had defeated him in his boxing career. He was scheduled to face Chagaev for his WBA title on 5 July 2008, but Chagaev pulled out with an injury. Valuev instead fought John Ruiz for the vacant title on 30 August 2008 and the WBA decided to make Chagaev "Champion In Recess". Valuev defeated Ruiz by unanimous decision to regain the WBA heavyweight championship, with Valuev and Chagaev set to fight no later than 26 June 2009 to determine whom the WBA regarded as their champion.

Valuev vs. Holyfield

Valuev's first title defense of his second reign as WBA Champion was against the 46-year-old, four-time heavyweight champion of the world, Evander Holyfield, on 20 December 2008. Before the match, Valuev weighed 310.8 pounds (141 kg), nearly 100 pounds heavier than Holyfield at 214.3 pounds (97 kg). After a rather uneventful match with no knockdowns and few punches thrown by either fighter, Valuev won a widely disputed majority decision. In response to the controversial result the WBA announced plans to investigate the decision.

Loss to Haye

In his second defense on 7 November 2009, billed as 'David vs. Goliath', Valuev faced off against former unified and lineal cruiserweight champion David Haye (22-1, 21 KOs) at the Arena Nürnberger Versicherung in Nuremberg. Valuev lost by a majority decision (114–114, 116–112, 116–112).

Retirement from boxing and health problems
Valuev announced his retirement from boxing in a Russian newspaper three days after the loss to Haye on 10 November 2009.

In 2010, Valuev's doctor went on record saying that he is treating Valuev for "serious bone and joint problems". Valuev underwent two operations that required at least six months on the sidelines.

Valuev confirmed in 2013 that medical advice was one of the reasons he is not planning to make a comeback in boxing.

Outside of boxing

Television career
Valuev's first role in a film was a cameo appearance in the German film 7 Zwerge – Der Wald ist nicht genug in 2006.  In 2008, Valuev played the main role in the film Stonehead by Philip Yankovskiy, playing an ex-boxer who lost his memory. The film took the main prize at the film festival "Window to Europe".  After the success of Stonehead, it was announced Valuev was being filmed in two new films at the same time.

In August 2016, Valuev became a presenter on Good Night, Little Ones!, Russia's long-running TV program for small children. He replaced Dmitry Malikov as the host.

Political career

In December 2011 Russian parliamentary election, Valuev became a member of the State Duma through the United Russia Party. On 17 December 2012, Valuev supported the law in the Russian Parliament banning adoption of Russian orphans by citizens of the US.

Following the IOC's decision to suspend Russia from participating in the Olympics under its flag due to the Russian state-sponsored doping scandal, Valuev said that Russia should go to the Olympics and "tear everyone apart to spite these bastards who want to kill our sport."

In September 2022, Valuev revealed he had been drafted to serve in the Russian armed forces.

Involvement in other sports
In 2011, Valuev became the general manager of the Russia national bandy team, and is tasked with developing the sport in the country. He is also the Vice-President of the Russian Bandy Federation. Bandy is considered a national sport in Russia.

Nikolai Valuev Boxing School and Youth Sports Foundation
In 2009, Valuev, together with a group of coaches, created the Nikolay Valuev Boxing School, with offices in Saint Petersburg and the Leningrad Oblast. The school is divided into three types of age groups: pupils (school terms 3-5), students (terms 6-8), and adults. School pupils participate and compete in various boxing matches, including the "Valuev Cup" youth boxing tournament, which became a regular competition in Saint Petersburg.

Professional boxing record

Filmography
2001: The town – issue #89
2003: Playing without rules – cameo
2006: 7 Zwerge – Der Wald ist nicht genug – cameo
2008: Rock Head – Yegor Golovin "Rock Head"
2009: Path – a prisoner nicknamed "The Beast"
2009: Fight without rules – Nicholas Shafts
2011: Antique Watches – cameo
2013: Bigfoot Files – himself

Notes

References

External links

1973 births
Living people
Politicians from Saint Petersburg
Sportspeople from Saint Petersburg
World heavyweight boxing champions
World Boxing Association champions
Russian male actors
United Russia politicians
Russian sportsperson-politicians
Russian male boxers
Russian bandy executives
Lesgaft National State University of Physical Education, Sport and Health alumni
21st-century Russian politicians
Russian Orthodox Christians from Russia
Competitors at the 1994 Goodwill Games
Sixth convocation members of the State Duma (Russian Federation)
Seventh convocation members of the State Duma (Russian Federation)
Eighth convocation members of the State Duma (Russian Federation)
Russian people of Tatar descent